Tatsue-ji (Tatsue Temple) (Japanese: 立江寺) is a Koyasan Shingon temple in Komatsushima, Tokushima Prefecture, Japan. It is Temple # 19 on the Shikoku 88 temple pilgrimage. The main image is of Jizō Bosatsu (Ksitigarbha Bodhisattva).

History
The temple was constructed during Emperor Shōmu's reign. 
In the Tenshō (天正) era, the temple was destroyed by fire Chōsokabe Motochika (長宗我部 元親) force, but the main statue was not damaged
In the Edo era, the temple was rebuilt with the support of Hachisuka clan (蜂須賀氏)
In 1974, the main hall was burnt, but the main statue was not damaged. The hall was rebuilt in 1977

See also
 Shikoku 88 temple pilgrimage

References

 四国八十八箇所霊場会 編 『先達教典』 2006年
 宮崎建樹 著 『四国遍路ひとり歩き同行二人』地図編 へんろみち保存協力会 2007年（第8版）

External links
 立江寺
 第19番札所 橋池山 摩尼院 立江寺（四国八十八ヶ所霊場会公式）

Buddhist pilgrimage sites in Japan
Buddhist temples in Tokushima Prefecture
Kōyasan Shingon temples